Llanengan (Welsh for "St. Einion's") is a small village and community  around Abersoch in Gwynedd in north-west Wales. It had a population of 2,024 at the 2001 census, which had been reduced to 1,989 at the 2011 Census. The popular seaside resort village of Abersoch falls within the community, as do the villages of Llangian, Mynytho, Machroes and Llanengan. The local public house is called the Sun.

Lead was formerly obtained from a lead mine just outside the village. A chimney can be seen on the left from the road to Porth Neigwl ("Hell's Mouth"), which marks the entrance to the former lead workings.

Church
The parish church, which is dedicated to Saint Einion Frenin, was originally established in the late 5th or early 6th century and is one of the oldest churches on the Llŷn Peninsula. In 1537, with the passing of the Dissolution of the Lesser Monasteries Act, St Mary's Abbey on Bardsey Island was dissolved and its monastic buildings demolished on the orders of Henry VIII. However, its choir stalls, two Rood screens and bells were saved and relocated to Llanengan Church as it had just been rebuilt in the early 1530s.

Governance 
An electoral ward in the same name exists. This ward is smaller than the Community, with a total population taken at the 2011 Census of 1,206.

Notable people 
 Ellen Hughes (1867–1927), a Welsh-language writer, temperance reformer and suffragist.
 David Green (1939–2016) a Welsh first-class cricketer

References

External links 

www.geograph.co.uk : photos of Llanengan and surrounding area